Loneliness Road is an album by keyboardist Jamie Saft, bassist Steve Swallow and drummer Bobby Previte with vocals by Iggy Pop featured on three tracks which was released on the RareNoise label in 2017.

Reception

On All About Jazz, Dan McClenaghan called it "A superior piano trio outing with bonus of Iggy Pop's cool contributions". In the Colorado Springs Independent Bill Kopp wrote "The trio of Saft, bassist Steve Swallow and drummer Bobby Previte turns in some unexpectedly accessible (and not at all avant-garde) jazz. And when Pop joins them on “Don’t Lose Yourself," “Everyday" and the title track, he delivers a gravelly, wavering vocal that is more Leonard Cohen than Stooges. Because it may mystify jazz fans and Iggy acolytes in equal measure, an open mind is necessary when listening to Loneliness Road".

Track listing
All compositions by Jamie Saft except where noted
 "Ten Nights" – 5:27
 "Little Harbour" – 4:21
 "Bookmaking" – 4:23
 "Don't Lose Yourself" (Jamie Saft, Iggy Pop) – 4:44
 "Henbane" – 4:01
 "Pinkus" – 7:41
 "The Barrier" – 5:44
 "Nainsook" –	4:18
 "Loneliness Road" (Saft, Pop) – 6:35
 "Unclouded Moon" – 7:41
 "Gates" – 2:52
 "Everyday" (Saft, Pop) – 3:42

Personnel
Jamie Saft – piano, organ
Steve Swallow – bass 
Bobby Previte – drums 
Iggy Pop – vocals (tracks 4, 9 & 12)

References

Jamie Saft albums
Steve Swallow albums
Bobby Previte albums
Iggy Pop albums
2017 albums
RareNoiseRecords albums